Candle Lake may refer to any of the following:

Candle Lake, Saskatchewan, a resort village in Saskatchewan, Canada
Candle Lake (Saskatchewan), a lake in Saskatchewan
Candle Lake Provincial Park, a park in Saskatchewan
Candle Lake Airpark, an airport in Saskatchewan